WMMZ (103.5 FM, "The River, 105 & 103-5") is a radio station broadcasting a classic hits music format. Licensed to Berwick, Pennsylvania, United States, the station is currently owned by Bold Gold Media. The WMMZ broadcast studio is co-located with WWRR inside the Mohegan Sun Pocono casino in Plains Township, Pennsylvania, United States.

On April 1, 2018, WMMZ changed their format from classic rock to a simulcast of classic hits-formatted WWRR 104.9 FM Scranton.

Previous logo

References

External links

MMZ
Classic hits radio stations in the United States
Columbia County, Pennsylvania
Radio stations established in 1992
1992 establishments in Pennsylvania